Kimiyo Matsuzaki (Japanese: 松崎キミ代, born June 18, 1938 in Takase, Kagawa Prefecture, Japan) is a former international table tennis player from Japan.

Table tennis career
From 1959 to 1963 she won many medals in singles, doubles, and team events in the Asian Table Tennis Championships, and in the World Table Tennis Championships.

The ten World Championship medals included seven gold medals; two in the singles at the 1957 World Table Tennis Championships and 1963 World Table Tennis Championships, three in the team event and one in the doubles at the 1963 World Table Tennis Championships with Masako Seki.

See also
 List of table tennis players
 List of World Table Tennis Championships medalists

References

External links
Kimiyo Matsuzaki (the first photograph) / Ryokuseikai (Alumni Association of Senshu University Table Tennis Team 

Japanese female table tennis players
Living people
Asian Games medalists in table tennis
Table tennis players at the 1962 Asian Games
Asian Games gold medalists for Japan
Asian Games bronze medalists for Japan
Medalists at the 1962 Asian Games
Year of birth missing (living people)